Adán Santos Sánchez Vallejo (April 14, 1984 – March 27, 2004), known professionally as Adán Chalino Sánchez in honour to his father, was an American-Mexican singer and composer. Like his father, he specialized in Regional Mexican music.

Biography
Sánchez was born in Torrance, California, the son of singer Chalino Sánchez. He was eight years old when his father was kidnapped and killed in the Mexican state of Sinaloa in 1992. His father's popularity skyrocketed after his death in 1992, giving way to a long series of compilation records, postmortem releases, and dedications. Raised by his mother in Paramount, California, he took up singing adopting his father nickname, "Chalino", and gained a strong local fan base among Mexican-American teenagers.

Sánchez recorded his first full-length album in 1994, entitled Soy el Hijo de Chalino, notable for the 10-year-old's brash and assertive vocals; the album's rousing title track evokes the style of celebrated singers from Mexico's Golden Age. As he grew into his teens, the majority of Sánchez's album titles began to revolve around the loss of his father, i.e. "La Corona de Mi Padre" and "Homenaje a Mi Padre". He was also able to widen the genre's popularity even further to teenage girls, thanks to his teen idol persona and focus on contemporary romantic ballads.

Kodak Theatre concert 
On March 20, 2004, Sánchez gave a concert and made history when he became the youngest headliner and first Regional-Mexican recording artist to sell out the Kodak Theatre in Hollywood. The songs he performed during his concert were "Necesito un amor" (I need a love), "Morenita" (Little dark one), "Paloma negra" (Black dove), "Fui tan feliz" (I was so happy), "Y dicen" (And they say), "Me canse De morir por tu amor" (I'm tired of dying for your love) and a medley of some of his father Chalino’s greatest hits, accompanied by images of him projected on large screens above the stage.

Death

One week after the concert, on March 27, 2004, Sánchez embarked on a promotional road-based tour through his father's home state of Sinaloa, Mexico. He was on his way to a concert in Tuxpan, Nayarit, Mexico, on the highway between Rosario and Escuinapa, when the 1990 Lincoln Town Car, owned by his father, blew a tire. According to police, the driver lost control and the vehicle rolled into a ditch. The performer sustained severe head injuries and was found dead at the scene, 18 days shy of his 20th birthday. More than 10,000 fans filled the streets outside the Los Angeles church where his funeral mass was held.

Funeral and legacy
Sánchez's remains were returned to the United States, where his family scheduled a public wake on April 1, 2004, at the St. John of God Church in Norwalk, California. The event drew national media attention for sparking civil unrest in the neighborhood surrounding the church that evening. As Sánchez was not well known among English-speaking authorities, local law enforcement vastly underestimated his fan-base, and were unprepared when more than 15,000 young people jammed the streets to attend the service. As the day wore on, the crowd of mourners grew out of control – Police were brought in to disperse the crowd, wearing riot gear and carrying pellet guns. Their appearance incited anger among members of the crowd, who surged into the streets, overturning portable toilets and rocking cars. It was reported that Sánchez's aunt, Juanita Sánchez, wept about the crowd's behavior. "Adan wouldn't have wanted people to act like this. It just causes more pain to the family", she said.

In 2005, a memorial statue was built for Adan in front of La Que Buena radio station in Burbank, California.

Always and Forever 
In 2009, Always & Forever a stage play by Michael Patrick Spillers, dramatized the impact of Sánchez's death on a group of young people in South Los Angeles. The play examines various aspects of Mexican-American culture (such as quinceañeras and Jesus Malverde).

Discography
1994	Soy el Hijo de Chalino []
1995	Dios Me Nego []
1995	Adios Amigo Del Alma
1996	El Compita
1997	Claveles De Enero
2000	La Corona de Mi Padre []
2002	Homenaje a Mi Padre []
2002	Siempre y Para Siempre []
2003	Canta Corridos []
2003	Homenaje a Mi Padre []
2003	El Soñador []

Posthumous
2004	Amor y Lágrimas[]
2004	En Sus Inicios, Vol. 2[]
2004	Mi Historia[]
2004	Mis Verdaderos Amigos[]
2005	Si Dios Me Lleva Con El[]
2005	En Vivo []
2006	Los Inmortales []
2006	A Recordando []
2006	El Unico []
2007	Duranguense

References

External links
Official Website(in Spanish)

1984 births
2004 deaths
American musicians of Mexican descent
Hispanic and Latino American musicians
Musicians from Los Angeles
Mexican male singers
Mexican people of American descent
Road incident deaths in Mexico
Singers from California
20th-century American singers
21st-century American singers
People from Torrance, California
20th-century American male singers
21st-century American male singers